Most police stations in the West Midlands county of England are now operated by the West Midlands Police, created on 1 April 1974, but many were built for its predecessors, and some of those closed before its creation. A number of the stations are listed buildings and others are locally listed by the relevant local authority. A few are operated by the British Transport Police.

This list also includes administrative buildings which do not have facilities for the visiting public.

Birmingham 

Before 1974, police stations in Birmingham were operated by Birmingham City Police. However, over the years, Birmingham has absorbed land from Staffordshire and Worcestershire, and with it came police staff and stations.

|}

Coventry 

|}

Dudley 

Dudley's stations were originally operated by Dudley Borough Police, then from 1 April 1966 until 31 March 1974, by West Midlands Constabulary.

|}

Sandwell 

Before 1974, police stations in Sandwell were operated by Staffordshire Police.

|}

Solihull 

|}

Walsall 

Walsall's stations were originally operated by Walsall Borough Police, then from 1 April 1966 until 31 March 1974, by West Midlands Constabulary.

|}

Wolverhampton 

Wolverhampton's stations were originally operated by Wolverhampton Borough Police, then from 1 April 1966 until 31 March 1974, by West Midlands Constabulary.

|}

References 

Law enforcement-related lists